Christopher Wursteisen (born c. 1570) was a law student at the University of Padua from 1595. He has been identified with the Cristiano Vurstisio who was credited by Galileo with introducing the teachings of Copernicus to the University, where Galileo was teaching mathematics. He may have been a son of Christian Wursteisen of Basel, who has also been credited with introducing the Copernican system to Padua.

According to German sources, Emanuel Wurstisen (1586–1601) was a son of Christian Wurstisen (1544–1588) and studied in Basel and became a doctor in Biel.

References

See also
 Dialogue Concerning the Two Chief World Systems

16th-century Italian astronomers
16th-century Italian mathematicians
University of Padua alumni